Bellver de Cerdanya is a town in the comarca of Cerdanya, province of Lleida, Catalonia, Spain.

Integrated villages and hamlets
Baltarga, 38 inhabitants
Beders, 14 inhabitants
Bellver de Cerdanya, 1.314 inhabitants
Bor, 94 inhabitants
Coborriu de Bellver, 20 inhabitants
Cortariu, 3 inhabitants
Cortàs, 18 inhabitants
Éller, 15 inhabitants
Nas, 7 inhabitants
Nèfol, 6 inhabitants, located in the Cadí-Moixeró Natural Park and mentioned as one of the villages involved in the Consecration of the Cathedral of Urgell in 839
Olià, 13 inhabitants
Ordèn, 10 inhabitants
Pedra, 13 inhabitants
Pi, 84 inhabitants
Riu de Santa Maria, 95 inhabitants
Sant Martí dels Castells, uninhabited
Santa Eugènia de Nerellà, 12 inhabitants
Santa Magdalena de Talló, 7 inhabitants
Talló, 31 inhabitants
Talltendre, 5 inhabitants
Vilella, 7 inhabitants

Places of interest
 In Baltarga, the Romanesque church dedicated to St. Andrew (11th century, with  two side chapels attached in 18th century);
 In Bor, the Romanesque church dedicated to St. Marcellus (11th century);
 in Coborriu de Bellver, the Romanesque church dedicated to St. Serni, first mentioned in the 10th century, suffered fire and destruction by the French in 1793 and during the Spanish Civil War in 1936; it was restored in 1967;
 in Cortàs, the Romanesque church of St. Polycarp (12th century);
 in Éller, the Romanesque church of Santa Eulalia (12th century);
 in Pedra, the Romanesque church of Santa Julia, ransacked by the Albigensian in 1198 and modified in the 15th century after an earthquake;
 in Pi, the Romanesque church of Santa Eulalia, vastly modified in the 18th century; only the lateral walls and the bell tower belong to the original structure;
 in Sant Martí dels Castells, the Romanesque chapel of St. Martin built inside the castle; its slightly pointed vault was rebuilt during Gothic times;
 in Santa Eugènia de Nerellà, the only original structure of the 10th century Romanesque church is the bell tower, heavily tilted towards southeast;
 in Talló the 11th century Romanesque church of Santa Maria; its bell tower was built in the 17th century;
 in Talltendre, the 12th century Romanesque church of Sant Iscle and Santa Victoria; its bell tower was built later.

References

Panareda Clopés, Josep Maria; Rios Calvet, Jaume; Rabella Vives, Josep Maria (1989). Guia de Catalunya, Barcelona: Caixa de Catalunya.  (Spanish).  (Catalan).

External links

 Government data pages 

Municipalities in Cerdanya (comarca)
Municipalities in the Province of Lleida
Populated places in the Province of Lleida